Welsh Music History / Hanes Cerddoriaeth Cymru is published by the University of Wales Press on behalf of the Centre for Advanced Welsh Music Studies, Bangor University.  It is a biennial bilingual journal contain academic articles and reviews relating to Welsh music and music in Wales.

It is being digitised by the Welsh Journals Online project at the National Library of Wales.

External links
Volume 1, 1996
Volume 2, 1997
Volume 3, 1999
Volume 4, 2000
Volume 5, 2002
Volume 6, 2004

Magazines published in Wales
Publications with year of establishment missing
Music journals
Multilingual journals
Bangor University
Welsh music history
Biennial journals
Publications established in 1996